Balta similis is a species from the genus Balta.

References

Blattodea
Cockroaches